Cyrtodactylus macrotuberculatus, also known as the tuberculate bent-toed gecko or the large tubercled bent-toed gecko,  is a species of gecko that is endemic to western Malaysia.

References 

Cyrtodactylus
Reptiles described in 2008